The PlayStation Store (PS Store) is a digital media store available to users of Sony's PlayStation 3, PlayStation Vita, PlayStation 4 and PlayStation 5 game consoles via the PlayStation Network.

The store offers a range of downloadable content both for purchase and available free of charge. Available content includes full games, add-on content, playable demos, themes and game/movie trailers.

History
Following feedback from many PlayStation Network users, a redesigned version of the PlayStation Store was launched on April 15, 2008, via a firmware update. The new design was OS based rather than the previous Store's web based design enabling the Store to process information more quickly.

A minor update to the store was released during Sony's E3 2009 press conference. This update makes the top page rotate pictures (including their links) regularly, and changes the navigation sounds.

A major redesign of the PlayStation Store was announced in September 2012, bringing with it a revised navigation structure and new search system. The new store has been developed to bring game and video content together and make it easier for users to find what they are looking for. Content will be integrated into each game's listing, rather than separate categories for items like add-ons, themes, and other downloadable content. The latest design is much less focused on text, and incorporates high-resolution artwork and smooth animations for featured content. The new redesign launched in Europe on October 22, 2012. Shortly after it was launched in the United Kingdom, the Store interface was reverted to the old design due to issues such as long load times and slow navigation, while other countries in Europe retained the new interface despite these issues. The redesign was released in North America on November 2, 2012.

In May 2020, the PlayStation Store has been indefinitely suspended in China due to security reasons. On March 2, 2021, Sony announced that it would discontinue offering movie and TV show purchases and rentals through the PlayStation Store on August 31, 2021.

Later that month, Sony also announced that it would be closing down the storefronts for PlayStation 3, PlayStation Portable, and PlayStation Vita games in July and August 2021. Sony's decision to make many of its older games inaccessible for purchase drew criticism from many, with concerns highlighting the publisher's approach towards game preservation, as well as the limitations of digital-only media, and its potential anti-consumer implications. Several small developers who had been producing titles for the PS Vita were not forewarned by Sony of the PlayStation Store's closure, requiring some to crunch to meet the deadline, while others whose games would not be ready made the decision to cancel them. As a result of the negative feedback, Sony announced on April 19, 2021, that they had reversed their decision to close the PS3 and Vita stores, leaving these available for the foreseeable future, though the PSP store will still close as originally planned on July 2, 2021. The day prior to the planned closure of the PSP store, Sony altered their plans again, and instead chose to simply disable the PlayStation Store app on the system, allowing PSP digital games to remain available for purchase on other systems.

On March 9, 2022, PlayStation announced that it suspended operations of the PlayStation Store in Russia in response to the 2022 Russian invasion of Ukraine.

Availability

PlayStation Store is available in 70 countries.

  Argentina*
  Australia
  Austria
  Bahrain*
  Belgium
  Bolivia*
  Brazil
  Bulgaria
  Canada
  Chile*
  China 
  Colombia*
  Costa Rica*
  Croatia
  Cyprus
  Czech Republic
  Denmark
  Ecuador*
  El Salvador*
  Finland

  France
  Germany
  Greece
  Guatemala*
  Honduras*
  Hong Kong
  Hungary
  Iceland*
  India
  Indonesia
  Ireland
  Israel
  Italy
  Japan
  Kuwait*
  Lebanon*
  Luxembourg
  Malaysia
  Malta
  Mexico

  Netherlands
  Nicaragua*
  New Zealand
  Norway
  Oman*
  Panama*
  Paraguay*
  Peru*
  Philippines*
  Poland
  Portugal
  Qatar*
  Romania
  Saudi Arabia*
  Singapore
  Slovakia
  Slovenia
  South Africa
  South Korea
  Spain

  Sweden
  Switzerland
  Taiwan
  Thailand
  Turkey
  Ukraine
  United Arab Emirates*
  United Kingdom
  United States
  Uruguay*

'*' = Country where PlayStation Network and Store are officially available, but the Store is in Global currency (USD/EUR), not in local currency.

Access and versions
The store is accessible through an icon on the XrossMediaBar on the PlayStation 3 and PlayStation Portable, via the Dynamic Menu on the PlayStation 4, and an icon on the LiveArea on the PlayStation Vita. The service is also available online through the Sony Entertainment Network website.

A master account is required to access the PlayStation Store. A log of all previously purchased items, known as "Download List", records each PlayStation Store account's complete download activity. A guest user can use their master account's Download List to download free content or to purchase content on another console; however, a single account can only be used on up to two consoles. This was previously five, but as of November 2011, Sony reduced this to two. The most recent firmware must be installed on the console to access the PlayStation Store. Each master account is associated with an online virtual "wallet" to which funds can be added. This wallet is then debited when a purchase is made from the store. Money can be added to the wallet through different systems of payment, although some of these are not available in all countries.

All purchases on the PlayStation Store are made in the user's local currency using a 'wallet' system whereby funds are added to the wallet—either in set denominations or an amount dictated by the price of the current transaction—then debited from the account's wallet when the user makes a purchase, funds added to the PS Store are non-refundable.

The user can add funds to their wallet in a number of ways, the most common of which is by credit or debit card. Users in many regions can also purchase PlayStation Network Cards or Tickets in set denominations from retailers including supermarkets or video game stores. These funds are redeemed on the PlayStation Store when the user enters the unique 12-digit code found on the card into the PlayStation Store. Nintendo themselves later adopted this currency system for their succeeding eShop. The Store's account, however, is region-locked and generally only accepts credit card that is billed in and PlayStation Network Cards purchased from the same country selected during the registration process, which cannot be changed afterwards.

PlayStation 3
PlayStation Store was launched within the PlayStation 3 on November 11, 2006. There are four different versions of the store on the platform: Asia, Europe (including Oceania and the Middle East), Japan and North America (including South America).

PlayStation Portable
PlayStation Store was supported on PlayStation Portable starting by October 2008 with 5.00 firmware update. The native PlayStation Store front on PSP was closed on March 31, 2016, while in-app purchases remained available after the store closed. PS Store functionality on PSP was fully closed on July 2, 2021.

PlayStation Vita
PlayStation Store was launched on the PlayStation Vita on December 17, 2011, and is accessible via an icon on the LiveArea. As of December 2016, all Vita games were also made available to be downloaded digitally on the PlayStation Network via the storefront, although not all games are released physically. There are four different versions of the PlayStation Store: Asia, Europe (including Oceania and the Middle East), Japan and North America. There is no Vita's PlayStation Store localization in China and South America.

PlayStation 4
PlayStation 4 version of the PlayStation Store was released on November 15, 2013, along with the console in North America, and on November 29 in most of Europe with the console two weeks following the North American launch. The PS4 version of the PS Store uses the same overall design and interface to its predecessor, the PlayStation 3's storefront; however, the color scheme has been altered to match that of the console's theme, changing from black to blue.

Internet browser

In January 2013, the PlayStation Store was made available via Internet browser. Users can purchase content for the PlayStation 3, PlayStation 4, PlayStation Vita, and PlayStation Portable via the online store, then download it (or put it in a download queue) via their respective devices. In October 2015, a "Wishlist" option was added. On October 15, 2020, in anticipation of the launch of the PlayStation 5, Sony announced that users would no longer be able to browse, purchase and download PS3, PSP and PS Vita content, and PS4 avatars, themes and applications via the desktop and mobile versions of the PlayStation Store.

PlayStation 5
PlayStation 5 version of PlayStation Store was released on November 12, 2020, along with the console in North America, Australia, New Zealand, Japan and South Korea, and on November 19, 2020, in rest of the world (excluding China) with the console seven days following the North American and Japan launch.

Legal issues
Prior to 2019, Sony had allowed third-party vendors such as Amazon and Wal-Mart to sell video game redemption codes for the PlayStation Store. Sony removed this feature in April 2019, so third-party vendors can only sell virtual currency for the PlayStation Store. In May 2021, a class-action lawsuit was filed in the United States District Court for the Northern District of California alleging that because Sony maintains a monopoly on the PlayStation Store, the removal of third-party sales violated antitrust laws. A second class-action lawsuit was filed the same month alleging that Sony's decision to eliminate third-party sales has led to overcharging consumers by billions of dollars.

See also
 Microsoft Store
 Ubisoft+
 Nintendo eShop

References

External links

 
Online-only retailers of video games
Online marketplaces
PlayStation (brand)
PlayStation (console)
Works banned in China